Rockcress is a common name used for several similar genera of flowering plants in the family Brassicaceae:

Arabis, with primarily Old World species
Arabidopsis, with primarily European species
Boechera, with primarily North American species
Cardaminopsis

Brassicaceae